Sobo may refer to:

Places
 Sobo, La Brea, Trinidad and Tobago
 Mount Sobo, Japan
 SoBo or South Mumbai

Other
 Sobo (deity)
 Sobo language (disambiguation)
 Alexandra Sobo (born 1987), Romanian volleyball player
 Sobo, an app for recording and distributing sound snippets, developed by Alan Braverman